Rockville is an unincorporated community in Susquehanna Township, Dauphin County, Pennsylvania, United States. The community is home to the Rockville Bridge.

Rockville is part of the Harrisburg–Carlisle Metropolitan Statistical Area.

Rockville was laid out in 1838 as Roberts Valley, by a family of settlers.

References

External links 

Pennsylvania's Historical Architecture and Archaeology site photos:  
Rockville Bridge (photos and information)
 
Rockville Bridge Photos (November 5, 2005)
  (Rockville Bridge) Rockville is on the west side of the bridge.
Susquehanna River Statue of Liberty replica images
Stan's Railpix : Conrail Photo Gallery (Rockville Bridge photos from November 1994)
 

Harrisburg–Carlisle metropolitan statistical area
Unincorporated communities in Dauphin County, Pennsylvania
Unincorporated communities in Pennsylvania